The Corsair 24 Mark II, also called the Corsair F-24 Mark II, is an American trailerable sailboat that was designed by Ian Farrier as a racer-cruiser and first built in 1996.

The Corsair 24 Mark II is a development of the Farrier F-24.

Production
The design was built by Corsair Marine in the United States, starting in 1996 as the F-24 Mark II. The name was changed to the Corsair 24 Mark II in 2000 when Farrier left the company and some minor changes made to the design. Production ran until 2003, with 200 boats completed, but it is now out of production.

Design

The Corsair 24 Mark II is a recreational trimaran, built predominantly of fiberglass. It has a fractional sloop rig with a rotating mast and folding bowsprit. The hull and the folding outriggers have nearly-plumb stems and  reverse transoms. The main hull mounts a transom-hung rudder controlled by a tiller with an extension. The boat has a single, hull-mounted daggerboard. It displaces  and carries no ballast. It has foam flotation to make it unsinkable.

The boat is normally fitted with a small outboard motor for docking and maneuvering.

The design has sleeping accommodation for two adults and two children, with a small double "V"-berth in the bow cabin and quarter berths in the main cabin. A cabin "pop-top" adds some headroom when open. A galley is optional, as is the portable head. The cabin was described by Darrell Nicholson in a Practical Sailor review as "cramped and limited".

Operational history
In a 2019 review for Practical Sailor, Darrell Nicholson described the boat as, "flat out fast and well built, but compared to a monohull (and you've heard this before), expensive and cramped down below."

See also
List of sailing boat types

Related development
Farrier F-22

References

External links

Trimarans
1990s sailboat type designs
Sailing yachts
Trailer sailers
Sailboat type designs by Ian Farrier
Sailboat types built by Corsair Marine